Serine/threonine-protein kinase 4 is an enzyme that in humans is encoded by the STK4 gene.

Function 

The protein encoded by this gene is a cytoplasmic kinase that is structurally similar to the yeast Ste20p (sterile 20 protein) kinase, which acts upstream of the stress-induced mitogen-activated protein kinase (MAPK) cascade. The encoded protein can phosphorylate myelin basic protein and undergoes autophosphorylation. A caspase-cleaved fragment of the encoded protein has been shown to be capable of phosphorylating histone H2B. The particular phosphorylation catalyzed by this protein has been correlated with apoptosis, and it's possible that this protein induces the chromatin condensation observed in this process.

Interactions 

STK4 has been shown to interact with PRKRIR.

STK4 has also been shown to prevent, through Yap1 coactivator modulation, haematological tumor cell apoptosis.

References

Further reading 

 
 
 
 
 
 
 
 
 
 
 
 
 
 
 
 

EC 2.7.11